Central Islip Senior High School is a high school in Central Islip, New York, United States, serving students in grades 9-12.  It is part of the Central Islip Union Free School District.

Academics 

According to 2007 data, 78.6% of Central Islip graduates earn a New York State Regent's diploma.  35.1 percent of graduates plan to attend four-year college, and 39.7% plan to attend a two-year college.

Athletics 

Central Islip fields varsity and junior varsity athletic teams in Section 11 of the New York State Public High School Athletic Association, including cross country, soccer, volleyball, football, swimming, tennis, bowling, basketball, wrestling, baseball, softball, and track.

References

External links

 Central Islip High School's website

Public high schools in New York (state)
Islip (town), New York
Schools in Suffolk County, New York